Lola Panda is a trademarked game character, featuring in children's mobile games created by Finnish computer game developer BeiZ. Lola is an anthropomorphic panda who typically wears a pink short-sleeved shirt, knee length jeans, and sneakers. In some games, she uses other kinds of clothing, suitable for the situation, e.g. swimsuit for the beach. Lola Panda games are aimed at children between 3 and 8 years of age and have been primarily developed for mobile devices

Games

Series

Other languages
The games are available in multiple languages, including English, Danish, Dutch, Finnish, German, Norwegian, Russian, Swedish, Chinese, Japanese, and Korean. Language selection varies between games and platforms. Lola Panda games reached one million downloads in August, 2012. At that time, the best selling game was Lola's Math Train.

References

External links
Official Lola Panda website
BeiZ company website

Children's educational video games
Software for children
Puzzle video games
Casual games
IOS games
MacOS games
Linux games
Windows games
Symbian games
IOS-only games
Nintendo DS games
Nintendo 3DS games
Windows Phone games
Android (operating system) games
Video games about bears
Video games developed in Finland